Casey Walker (born December 6, 1989) is a former American football nose tackle. He played college football at Oklahoma. He was a member of the Carolina Panthers, New England Patriots, Baltimore Ravens, Dallas Cowboys, and Buffalo Bills.

Early years
Walker played high school football for the Garland Owls of Garland High School. He recorded 22 tackles, two sacks, two forced fumbles and seven QB hurries in 2007. He totaled 25 tackles, two sacks, a fumble recovery and two QB hurries in 2006.

College career
Walker played for the Oklahoma Sooners from 2009 to 2012. He was redshirted in 2008.

Professional career

Carolina Panthers
Walker was signed by the Carolina Panthers on April 30, 2013, after going undrafted in the 2013 NFL Draft. He was released by the Panthers on August 31 and signed to the team's practice squad on September 1, 2013. He was released by the Panthers on October 30, 2013. Walker was signed to a future's contract by the Panthers on January 4, 2014. He was released by the Panthers on August 30 and signed to the team's practice squad on September 1, 2014.

New England Patriots
Walker was signed off the Carolina Panthers' practice squad by the New England Patriots on September 27, 2014. He made his NFL debut on October 5, 2014, against the Cincinnati Bengals.

On November 20, 2014, the Patriots waived Walker to make room for LeGarrette Blount. He was re-signed to their practice squad on November 22, 2014.

Baltimore Ravens
On December 16, 2014, the Baltimore Ravens signed Walker off the Patriots' practice squad. He was released by the Ravens on August 5, 2015.

New England Patriots
On August 14, 2015, the New England Patriots signed Walker. He was released by the Patriots on September 4, 2015.

Dallas Cowboys
Walker was signed to the Dallas Cowboys' practice squad on October 21, 2015. On December 25, he was promoted to the active roster along with quarterback Jameill Showers, after the Cowboys placed tight end Gavin Escobar and quarterback Tony Romo on the injured reserve list. He played in two games and posted two tackles. Walker was released by the team on July 18, 2016.

Buffalo Bills
On July 30, 2016, Walker was signed by the Buffalo Bills. On September 2, 2016, he was released by the Bills as part of final roster cuts.

Coaching career
Walker is currently the defensive line coach at Texas A&M University Commerce in Commerce, Texas

References

External links
NFL draft scout

Living people
1989 births
Garland High School alumni
American football defensive tackles
African-American players of American football
Oklahoma Sooners football players
Carolina Panthers players
New England Patriots players
Baltimore Ravens players
Buffalo Bills players
Dallas Cowboys players
Players of American football from Texas
People from Garland, Texas
Junior college football coaches in the United States
21st-century African-American sportspeople
20th-century African-American people